The following is a list of episodes from the series Mighty Magiswords created by Kyle Carrozza. On February 9, 2017, Mighty Magiswords was renewed for a second season as well as a new mobile game, Surely You Quest (in tie with its previous mobile game, MagiMobile).

As of May 17, 2019, 92 episodes of the series have aired.

Series overview

Episodes

Pilot (2016)

Season 1 (2016–18)

Season 2 (2018–19)

Digital shorts series

Series 1 (2015)

Series 2 (2016–17)

Series 3 (2017): Adventure Academy

Segments list
Cartoon Network ordered and finished 15 Mighty Magiswords micro-shorts for the CN Anything app. The object of the app involves a situation involving the Warriors for Hire and it's up for the players to "Choose Your Magisword" to help the Warriors succeed on their goal. The segments air in out of order and several clips of them can be found in some Mighty Magiswords promos.

Mighty Magiswords Vlogs!
These vlogs feature Vambre and Prohyas presenting each of their Magiswords to the audience watching them. These vlogs were recorded at creator Kyle Carrozza's desk in his CN office using a basic idea for each vlog with the dialogue completely ad-libbed, and were animated in-house at Cartoon Network Studios. They're available on Cartoon Network's official YouTube channel and air frequently on TV during promos.

Notes

Footnotes

References

Lists of American children's animated television series episodes
Lists of Cartoon Network television series episodes
2010s television-related lists